is a waterfall in northern Aoi-ku, Shizuoka, Japan, on the upper reaches of the Abe River. It is located near the Umegashima onsen resort area.

The Abe Great Falls is listed as one of the "Japan’s Top 100 Waterfalls", in a listing published by the Japanese Ministry of the Environment in 1990.

External links
Shizuoka City tourism home page
  Hello Navi Shizuoka

Waterfalls of Japan
Shizuoka (city)
Landforms of Shizuoka Prefecture
Tourist attractions in Shizuoka Prefecture